Promalactis similiconvexa is a moth of the family Oecophoridae. It is found in Sichuan, China.

The wingspan is about 15.5 mm. The forewings are ochreous brown with white markings edged with black scales. The hindwings and cilia are dark grey.

Etymology
The specific name is derived from the Latin prefix simili- (meaning similar) and the species name convexa and refers to the similarity of the two species.

References

Moths described in 2013
Oecophorinae
Insects of China